The Blue and Brown Books are two sets of notes taken during lectures conducted by Ludwig Wittgenstein from 1933 to 1935. They were mimeographed as two separate books, and a few copies were circulated in a restricted circle during Wittgenstein's lifetime. The lecture notes from 1933–1934 were bound in blue cloth, and the notes dictated in 1934–1935 were bound in brown. Rush Rhees published these together for the first time in 1958 as Preliminary Studies for the "Philosophical Investigations".

Inchoate versions of many of the ideas that would later be more fully explored in the Philosophical Investigations are found there, so these offer textual evidence for the genesis of what became known as Wittgenstein's later philosophy.

The Blue Book
The Blue Book was dictated from 1933 to 1934, and contains certain themes unaddressed in Wittgenstein's later works, including deliberations on thinking as operating with signs. An early conception of what would later become known as language-games is present in the text, which represents the first period of Wittgenstein's thought after 1932, a method of linguistic analysis which would later become ordinary language philosophy.

While Wittgenstein in The Blue Book is not dogmatic nor systematic, he does provide arguments that point toward a more self-critical view of language. For example, he does not think that "understanding" and "explaining" are necessarily related. He suggests that when humans are learning a language-game they are actually being trained to understand it. He writes:

As the citation suggests, Wittgenstein views understanding a language-game as being mostly concerned with training (which he calls "drill[ing]" in the above citation). Having said that, Wittgenstein is not one to believe that even understanding a language-game can be reduced to one process; like the plethora of language-games available to human beings, there are also plethora of "understandings." For example, the "understanding" of a language may come about by the "drilling" of the association between the word "yellow" and a yellow-patch; or it may involve learning rules, like rules used in the game of chess. Moreover, Wittgenstein doesn't think that humans use language mechanically, as if following a calculus. He writes in The Blue Book, "[I]n general we don't use language according to strict rules—it hasn't been taught us by means of strict rules, either."

Wittgenstein clarifies the problem of communicating using a human language when he discusses learning a language by "ostensive defining." For example, if one wanted to teach someone that a pencil was called a "pencil" and pointed to a pencil and said, "pencil," how does the listener know that what one is trying to convey is that the thing in front of me (e.g., the entire pencil) is called a "pencil"? Isn't it possible that the listener would associate "pencil" with "wood"? Maybe the listener would associate the word "pencil" with "round" instead (as pencils are, usually, in fact, round!). Wittgenstein writes regarding several possible "interpretations" which may arise after such a lesson. The student may interpret your pointing at a pencil and saying "pencil" to mean the following: (1) This is a pencil; (2) This is round; (3) This is wood; (4) This is one; (5) This is hard, etc., etc.

The Brown Book
During the academic year 1934–1935, Wittgenstein dictated to Francis Skinner and Alice Ambrose a text of which three copies were typed and bound. Later it became known as The Brown Book. Wittgenstein contemplated publishing and attempted a German revision, but ultimately abandoned the project as worthless.

Possible further book
A further item called The Pink Book or The Yellow Book has been speculated to exist, and may be contained in an archive of papers that Wittgenstein posted to a friend of Skinner days after his death.

In popular culture
In the film Ex Machina, the name of the company designing the artificial intelligence is named 'Blue Book' after Wittgenstein's set of notes, and it is loosely modeled on Google.

In the novel “A Philosophical Investigation” by Phillip Kerr a dialogue between a killer identified as neuro-anatomically different and an intuitive female detective occurs. The neuro-anatomical abnormality is supposed to indicate a propensity for murder and individuals are identified and prospectively managed. They are assigned code names in an allegedly anonymised database. The murderer assigned the code name Wittgenstein is tipped into murder by his “diagnosis” hacks into the database and proceeds to murder other abnormal individuals, code named after other philosophers, to prevent them from murdering others. Eventually he is identified but attempts suicide prior to his anticipated trial and punishment by induction of permanent vegetative coma which has replaced the death penalty. Written in the 1990 the novel is a dystopian scientific futuristic fantasy informed throughout by Wittgenstein’s philosophical stances.

References

Ludwig Wittgenstein
Books by Ludwig Wittgenstein
Contemporary philosophical literature
Philosophy of language literature
Analytic philosophy literature
Philosophy books
Logic books
1979 non-fiction books
Books of lectures